Turbonilla gracilior is a species of sea snail, a marine gastropod mollusk in the family Pyramidellidae, the pyrams and their allies.

Description
The milk-white shell has an elongate-conic shape. Its length measures 6.1 mm.  (The whorls of the protoconch aredecollated). The eleven whorls of the teleoconch are well rounded. They are moderately shouldered at the  summit; later ones slightly exserted at the summit. They are marked by slender, sinuous, slightly protractive axial ribs, of which 16 occur upon the first and second, 18 upon the third, 20 upon the fourth to seventh, 22 upon the eighth, 26 upon the ninth, and 32 upon the penultimate turn. The intercostal spaces are about twice as wide as the ribs. They are marked by a double series of pits, the first of which is at the periphery, the second a little posterior to the middle between the sutures. In addition to these pits, they are marked by fine, equal and equally spaced spiral striations of which thirty-one probably occur between the peripheral and median pit and twenty between that and the summit. The sutures are well marked. The periphery and the base of the body whorl are well rounded. They are  marked by the continuations of the axial ribs and numerous fine, well-incised, wavy spiral striations. The aperture is rather long, and rhomboidal. The outer lip is fractured. The columella is moderately strong, slightly curved and somewhat reflected. It is provided with a weak oblique fold at its insertion.

Description
The type specimen of this marine species was found off Panama.

References

External links
 To World Register of Marine Species

gracilior
Gastropods described in 1852